Heather Stephens is a former American actress. She starred on ABC's The Forgotten as Lindsey Drake alongside Christian Slater.

Filmography

Film

Television

External links 
 

Living people
21st-century American actresses
20th-century American actresses
American television actresses
Year of birth missing (living people)